Polonia Bytom is a Polish football club based in Bytom, founded in 1920, two times Polish Champions. The team currently plays in the III liga (as of 2022–23).

History

Beginnings

Polonia was founded on 4 January 1920 in the Upper Silesian city of Bytom, during the hectic months of the Silesian Uprisings. In late 1922, however, as a result of the Upper Silesia plebiscite, Bytom remained part of Germany and the club ceased to exist.

In May 1945, numerous players and officials of another Polish club, Pogoń Lwów, arrived in Bytom and decided to revive Polonia. On 17 May 1945, the team played its first game in over two decades, defeating Warta Poznań 3–2.

Polonia is considered the continuation of Pogoń Lwów; its logo is very similar to the logo of Lwów's team as well as their colours, red-blue.

1950s and 1960s
Polonia achieved greatest success in the 1950s and 1960s, when it was one of the top teams in Poland. It has won the Polish championship twice, in 1954 and 1962. In 1952, 1958, 1959 and 1961 Polonia Bytom was the vice-champion of Poland. It reached the Polish Cup final in 1964. It performed well in the Intertoto Cup, reaching the final in the 1963–64 season after defeating teams such as Red Star Belgrade, Sampdoria and fellow Polish side Odra Opole. It won the trophy in the 1964–65 season after defeating teams like RC Lens, Schalke 04, Liège and SC Leipzig. Polonia also won the 1965 International Soccer League and finished third in the Polish league in the 1965–66 and 1968–69 seasons.

During that period, Polish international player and goalkeeper Edward Szymkowiak played for Polonia. The club stadium is named after him, and has a capacity of 5,500 spectators.

Recent times
In June 2007 Polonia Bytom, after many years, returned to the Polish Ekstraklasa. However, in 2011, the club was relegated to the I liga after finishing bottom of the table with just six wins all season.

Honours

Domestic 
 Ekstraklasa
 Winners (2): 1954, 1962
 Runner-up (4): 1952, 1958, 1959, 1961
 Polish Cup
 Runner-up (3): 1963–64, 1972–73, 1976—77

Continental 

 UEFA Intertoto Cup
 Winners (1): 1964–65
 Runner-up (1): 1963–64
 International Soccer League
 Winners (1): 1965

Youth Teams 
Polish U-19 Champion: 1963, 1970, 1978
 Polish U-19 Runner Up: 1956

Supporters 
Polonia Bytom supporters were the first organised fan-club in Poland. They have introduced scarfs, flags and organised chants. Many of the other supporters groups were travelling to Bytom only to watch how Polonia's fans are cheering their club and behaving on the stadium.

The fans have friendships with fans of  Arka Gdynia which dates back to 1974, one of the longest friendships in supporter history which has survived to date; and with fans of Odra Opole, since 1987.

Polonia biggest rivals are local teams Górnik Zabrze, Ruch Radzionków, Ruch Chorzów (The Oldest Silesian Derby) and Szombierki Bytom (Derby of Bytom). The other groups which are not very welcome in Bytom are fans from Zaglebie Sosnowiec, Legia Warszawa and Lechia Gdańsk.

Polonia Bytom firm is commonly known as Desperados.

League participations 
Ekstraklasa: 1948–1949 (2 seasons), 1951–1955 (5 seasons), 1957–1976 (20 seasons), 1977–1980, 1986–1987, 2007–2011

First League: 1950, 1956, 1976–1977, 1980–1986, 1987–2001, 2005–2007, 2011–2013

Second League: 2001–2005, 2013–2014, 2015–2017

Third League: 2014–2015

Current squad

Polonia in Europe

References

External links 
 Club logo
 
 Official FanClub

 
Sport in Bytom
Association football clubs established in 1920
Football clubs in Silesian Voivodeship